Hussar is a village in southern Alberta, Canada within Wheatland County.

History 
Hussar was unofficially founded in 1913 when the Canadian Pacific Railway (CPR) established a station and named it Hussar. A community grew up around the station and was incorporated as a village in 1928. The name Hussar for the station was used in honour of a group of German soldiers who belonged to a German Hussar (cavalry) regiment who earlier had established a large farm near Hussar. With the start of World War I most of the soldiers returned to Germany and those who remained were interned for the duration of the war. The land, which was part of this German Canadian Farming Co. Ltd., was purchased after the war. Following the war, the community, both the village and the surrounding area, began to grow with an influx of settlers from around the world. English, Irish, Scots and Danes made up the bulk of the settlers. Many of those settlers' descendants still reside in or around the community.

Demographics 

See also 
List of communities in Alberta
List of villages in Alberta

References

External links 

1928 establishments in Alberta
Villages in Alberta